The 2013 Peugeot Tennis Cup was a professional tennis tournament played on clay courts. It is the second edition of the tournament which was part of the 2013 ATP Challenger Tour. It took place in Rio de Janeiro, Brazil between 5 and 11 August 2013.

Singles main draw entrants

Seeds

 1 Rankings are as of July 30, 2013.

Other entrants
The following players received wildcards into the singles main draw:
  Carlos Eduardo Severino
  Christian Lindell
  Wilson Leite
  Emilio Gómez

The following players received entry from the qualifying draw:
  Juan Ignacio Londero
  Bastián Malla
  Tiago Fernandes
  Christian Garin

Champions

Singles

  Agustín Velotti def.  Blaž Rola 6–3, 6-4

Doubles

  Thiemo de Bakker /  André Sá def.  Marcelo Demoliner /  João Souza

External links
Official Website

Peugeot Tennis Cup
Peugeot Tennis Cup
2013 in Brazilian tennis